is a United States government-funded news broadcaster in Asia in operation since 1996.

 may also refer to:
Radio Free Asia (Committee for a Free Asia), an anti-communist news agency operated from 1951 to 1955 by the United States Central Intelligence Agency
Radio of Free Asia, sometimes also referred to as Radio Free Asia